The Tower of Furiani is a Genoese tower located in the commune of Furiani on the Corsica.

The tower was one of a series of defences constructed by the Republic of Genoa between 1530 and 1620 to stem the attacks by Barbary pirates.

In 1987 the tower was listed as one of the official historical monuments of France.

See also
List of Genoese towers in Corsica

References

Towers in Corsica
Monuments historiques of Corsica